"Bobby Jean" is a song written and performed by Bruce Springsteen, from his 1984 album Born in the U.S.A.  Although not released as a single, it reached number 36 on the Billboard Mainstream Rock Tracks chart.

History
"Bobby Jean" was one of the last songs from the album to be recorded, and was considered a musical breakthrough for Springsteen during the recording, with its more accented rhythm and near dance groove.

The title character's name is somewhat gender ambiguous, allowing for various interpretations. Nonetheless, "Bobby Jean" is often considered to have been written about his long-time friendship with Steve Van Zandt, who was leaving the E Street Band at the time: for example, Swedish journalist Richard Ohlsson made the interpretation in his book Bruce Springsteen: 16 Album that the title contained both a male and a female name because "the friendship with Bobby Jean is so strong that it's almost a kind of love." When this song is played live with the E Street Band, close ups of Van Zandt are often shown on the bigscreens.

Now you hung with me, when all the others turned away ... turned up their nose
We liked the same music — we liked the same bands — we liked the same clothes
We told each other, that we were the wildest, the wildest things we'd ever seen ...

The lyric turns to deeper emotions, which Springsteen biographer Dave Marsh characterized as "lines that mingle love, grief, and rancor", with the chorus summing:

Now I wished you would have told me —
I wished I could have talked to you —
Just to say goodbye, Bobby Jean ...

At the conclusion, Springsteen imagines the song's subject hearing the very song in a motel room, as Roy Bittan's piano riff that drives the song yields to a saxophone coda from Clarence Clemons and the recording fades out.  Marsh suggests that Springsteen was not singing a farewell just to Van Zandt, but also to his own depressed Nebraska self.  Nevertheless, use of minor to major altered chord in the last parts of the chorus lend the song a spirit of generosity.

Live performances
The song has become one of Bruce Springsteen's more popular concert staples, with about 596 performances through 2013.

During the 1984-85 Born in the U.S.A. Tour, "Bobby Jean" appeared frequently throughout the shows with a loud audience response, during the 1988 Tunnel of Love Express, the song generally appeared first or last; though by the 1992-93 "Other Band" Tour, "Bobby Jean" was not heard during concerts. By the Ghost of Tom Joad Tour, the song was suddenly turned into a short four-minute performance with only Springsteen doing his opening on harmonica and acoustic guitar. It remained to have several performances on the Reunion Tour and only several times on The Rising Tour.

By the Devils & Dust Tour, the acoustic version had turned given yet another warm welcome back by fans, however, by the start of the Sessions Band Tour, "Bobby Jean" appeared, still on acoustic guitar and harmonica only this time the large outfit were playing a folk-like tune in the back that made it sound rather depressing. Springsteen and the E Streeters since reverted to playing the original version on the late 2000s Magic Tour and Working on a Dream Tour, being occasionally setlisted, usually being heard in the band's encore.  Springsteen performed "Bobby Jean" with Phish during their closing set at the 2009 Bonnaroo Music Festival. In 2010 a live version of the song appeared on the live DVD London Calling: Live in Hyde Park. The song was used as the primary closer of the shows throughout 2016/2017 tour.

In recent years, crowds, especially in Europe, have taken the habit of arm-waving in unison throughout the song.

Eddie Vedder from Pearl Jam made a surprise appearance on March 24, 2016 in Seattle when he joined Springsteen and the band for "Bobby Jean."

Critical reception
The aggregation of critics' lists at Acclaimed Music did not place this song in its list of the top 3000 songs of all time, but rated it as one of the 1984 songs "bubbling under" the top 3000.

Personnel
According to authors Philippe Margotin and Jean-Michel Guesdon:

Bruce Springsteen – vocals, guitars
Roy Bittan – synthesizer, piano
Clarence Clemons – saxophone, tambourine
Danny Federici – glockenspiel
Garry Tallent – bass
Max Weinberg – drums

Covers
"Bobby Jean" was covered by Portastatic on their 2003 Autumn Was a Lark album.

References

External links
 Lyrics & Audio clips from Brucespringsteen.net

Bruce Springsteen songs
1984 songs
Songs written by Bruce Springsteen
Song recordings produced by Jon Landau
Song recordings produced by Bruce Springsteen
Song recordings produced by Steven Van Zandt
Song recordings produced by Chuck Plotkin